ICBC may stand for:

Imperial College Boat Club, in London, England
Industrial and Commercial Bank of China
Insurance Corporation of British Columbia, a provincial crown corporation in charge of drivers' licenses and auto insurance
Inter-Collegiate Business Competition, hosted by Queen's University in Kingston, Ontario, Canada
Inner City Broadcasting Corporation, a former United States media company